The Kazakh Steppe (also Uly dala, Ұлы дала "Great Steppe"), also called the Great Dala, is a vast region of open grassland in northern Kazakhstan and adjacent portions of Russia. It lies east of the Pontic steppe and west of the Emin Valley steppe, with which it forms part of the Eurasian steppe. The Kazakh Steppe is an ecoregion of the temperate grasslands, savannas, and shrublands biome in the Palearctic realm. Before the mid-nineteenth century it was called the Kirghiz steppe, 'Kirghiz' being an old Russian word for the Kazakhs.

Setting
The steppe extends more than 2,200 km from the area east of the Caspian Depression and north of the Aral Sea, all the way to the Altai Mountains. It is the largest dry steppe region on earth, covering approximately 804,450 square kilometers. The Kazakh Steppe lies at the southern end of the Ural Mountains, the traditional dividing line between Europe and Asia. Much of the steppe is considered to be semi-desert, grading into desert as one goes further south. The Turan Lowland lies in  the southwestern part of the steppe, but elevation increases as one travels east or to the northern parts of the steppe, with a few exceptions.

The Pontic Steppe lies to the west and northwest. To the north and northeast of the Kazakh Steppe lies the Kazakh forest steppe, an ecoregion of pine groves interspersed with grasslands that forms a transition between the Kazakh steppe and the forests of Siberia. To the south lies the Kazakh semi-desert and the Kazakh upland ecoregions. The Kokshetau Massif in north-central Kazakhstan harbors an enclave of the Kazakh upland, distinct from the Kazakh steppe which surrounds it at lower elevations.

Climate
The region has a semi-arid, continental climate. Most of the area falls under the cool semi-arid (BSk) classification under the Köppen climate classification system, although the moister north is classed as humid continental (Dfa/Dfb). Very high winds sweep across the plains at times.

Flora
Because of low rainfall, the steppe has few trees, and consists of mostly grasslands and large, sandy areas.  Typical vegetation includes feathergrass (Stipa), wormwood (Artemisia (genus)), and fescue (Festuca).

Fauna
Animals that can be found in the steppes of Kazakhstan include the Saiga antelope, Siberian roe deer, wolves, foxes, badgers, Mongolian gerbils, and steppe tortoises.

People

The western part of the Kazakh Steppe is very sparsely populated, with between two and three people per square kilometer. As one heads east across the plains, the population density increases to between four and seven people per square kilometer. Kazakh people make up the majority of the people living in the area. Russia leases approximately 7,360 square kilometers in the southern region of the steppe for the world's oldest space launch facility, Baikonur Cosmodrome.

In popular culture
The movie Tulpan was shot and set in the Kazakh Steppe.

See also
 Saryarka — Steppe and Lakes of Northern Kazakhstan
 Steppe Route
 List of ecoregions in Russia

References

External links
 CIA, The World Factbook, 2004
 
 Saudi Aramco World, 
 surfbirds.com, 
 Holidays in Kazakhstan

Eurasian Steppe
Temperate grasslands, savannas, and shrublands
Steppe
Steppe
Ecoregions of Kazakhstan
Ecoregions of Russia
Physiographic provinces
Ecoregions of Asia
Palearctic ecoregions